Benvenuti is an Italian surname meaning "welcome". Notable people with the surname include:

Andrea Benvenuti (born 1969), Italian Olympic runner
Augusto Benvenuti (1839–1899), Italian sculptor
Beatrice Benvenuti (born 1993), Italian rugby referee
Nino Benvenuti (born 1938), Italian professional boxer
Pietro Benvenuti (1769–1844), Italian academic painter
Tomaso Benvenuti (1838–1906), Italian opera composer
Tommaso Benvenuti (rugby union) (born 1990), Italian rugby player

Italian-language surnames